Broke may refer to:

Arts, entertainment, and media

Film and television
 Broke (1991 film), a 1991 British television film by Stephen Bill in the anthology series ScreenPlay
Broke (2009 film), a Canadian documentary film
 Broke*, a 2011 film
 Broke, a 2012 film by Rakontur
 Broke (2016 film), an Australian film
Broke (2017 TV series), a web series
Broke (2020 TV series), a sitcom
 "Broke" (The Office), a 2009 episode of The Office
 Broke, 2012 episode from Volume II of ESPN's 30 for 30

Music
 Broke (album), a 2000 Hed PE album
 Broke, an album by Kazzer
 "Broke" (Modest Mouse song), a 1996 song by Modest Mouse
 "Broke", a song by The Beta Band from the album Hot Shots II
 "Broke", a song by Cassius Henry
 "Broke", a song by Nelly from the album 5.0

Other uses in arts, entertainment, and media
 Broke: The Plan to Restore Our Trust, Truth, and Treasure, a 2010 book written by national TV and radio host Glenn Beck
 Broke: Who Killed the Middle Classes?
 Tony Broke, hero of the British comic strip Ivor Lott and Tony Broke

Other uses
 Broke baronets, two extinct titles, one in the Baronetage of England, the other in the Baronetage of the United Kingdom
 , three Royal Navy vessels
 Insolvent, as in "flat broke"
 Broke, New South Wales
 Broke (surname)

See also
 Bankruptcy
 Break (disambiguation)
 Broken (disambiguation)